This is a list of Sepahan F.C.'s results at the Persian Gulf Cup 2009–10, Hazfi Cup 2009-10 and 2010 ACL. The club is competing in the Iran Pro League, Hazfi Cup and Asian Champions League.

Persian Gulf Cup

Statistics

Matches

Last updated 18 December 2009

Results by round

Results summary

League standings

Top scorers and assists

Goal scorers 
10 Goals
  Emad Mohammed

6 Goals
  Ahmad Jamshidian

5 Goals
  Ibrahima Touré

3 Goals
  Farzad Hatami
  Ehsan Hajsafi
  Hadi Aghily

2 Goals
  Mehdi Jafarpour

1 Goal
  Ahmad Alenemeh
  Javad Maheri
  Mohsen Bengar

Assists 
7 Assists
  Ehsan Hajsafi

4 Assists
  Ahmad Jamshidian

2 Assists
  Jalal Hosseini
  Ibrahima Touré

1 Assist
  Hossein Papi
  Mehdi Karimian
  Mehdi Jafarpour
  Mohsen Bengar
  Moharram Navidkia

Cards

Matches played 
18 Matches
  Mohsen Bengar
  Jalal Hosseini

17 Matches
  Shahin Kheiri
  Mehdi Rahmati

Asian Champions League

Group C

Squad changes during 2009/10 season

In

Out

References

Sepahan S.C. seasons
Sepahan